Improvising Artists Inc. known as IAI is a production company created by jazz pianist, Paul Bley, and video artist, Carol Goss, in 1974 for the purpose of recording improvised music and video art.

Discography

References

External links
Official site

American record labels
Jazz record labels